Yuriy Kopyna (born 4 July 1996) is a professional Ukrainian football midfielder who plays for Oleksandriya.

Career
Born in Pustomyty Raion, Kopyna is a product of the different youth sportive schools. His first trainer was Roman Marych.

He spent his career in the Ukrainian Premier League Reserves club FC Metalist. And in spring 2016 Kopyna was promoted to the Ukrainian Premier League's squad. He made his debut for Metalist Kharkiv in the Ukrainian Premier League in a match against FC Stal Dniprodzerzhynsk on 23 April 2016.

References

External links

1996 births
Living people
Ukrainian footballers
FC Metalist Kharkiv players
FC Lviv players
FC Rukh Lviv players
FC Oleksandriya players
Association football midfielders
Ukrainian Premier League players
Ukrainian First League players
Ukrainian Second League players
Ukrainian Amateur Football Championship players
Sportspeople from Lviv Oblast